Michèle Taylor is an American diplomat who is the current United States ambassador to the United Nations Human Rights Council. She previously served as a board member of the National Center for Civil and Human Rights and was a founding board member and vice chair of President Joe Biden’s Super PAC, Unite The Country.

Early life and education
Taylor was born in Palo Alto, California. She earned a Bachelor of Arts degree from Mills College and Master of Arts in mathematics from Boston University.

Career
Taylor has held leadership positions for human rights organizations such as the Anti-Defamation League, Battleground Georgia, the Georgia Network to End Sexual Assault, and the Atlanta chapter of the Electing Women Alliance, which she co-founded alongside Jina Sinone, Pinney Allen, Nancy Koziol, and Sonya Halpern.  
 
In 2012, Taylor joined the Democratic National Committee. She served as Vice Chair of the National Finance Committee until 2016.
 
In 2014, she was appointed to the United States Holocaust Memorial Council by then-president Barack Obama, where she served on committees addressing antisemitism, Holocaust denial, and global genocide and atrocity prevention. In the same year, Taylor was invited to serve as a consultant to the White House on the Violence Against Women Act’s 20th anniversary. Additionally, she joined the Anti-Defamation League’s Southeastern board, a role she held until 2017.

Taylor co-founded and served as vice chair of the pro-Biden Super PAC, Unite The Country. Following the general election in November 2020, Taylor founded and worked as chair/CEO of Battleground Georgia.
 
She is part of the Leadership Atlanta alumni class of 2018.

Taylor has been a board member, a course director, and a lead instructor with North Carolina’s Outward Bound program since 2004.
 
She serves as a board member, governance chair, and the guest programming Co-Chair of the Atlanta Jewish Film Society, which hosts the Atlanta Jewish Film Festival where she has introduced films.
 
Taylor has served in several leadership roles with the board of the National Center for Civil and Human Rights. In 2018, she and her husband chaired the Center’s Power to Inspire event where Joe Biden was honored and served as the keynote speaker.
 
Since 2010, Taylor has served as the treasurer of the Atlanta Midtown Improvement District board. She was appointed by Mayors Kasim Reed and Keisha Lance Bottoms to the role.

UN Human Rights Council
On October 21, 2021, President Joe Biden nominated Taylor to be the US Ambassador to the UN Human Rights Council. Hearings on her nomination were held before the Senate Foreign Relations Committee on December 14, 2021. The committee reported her nomination favorably on January 12, 2022. On February 17, 2022, the U.S. Senate confirmed Taylor by voice vote. She assumed office on February 22, 2022.

Personal life
Taylor is Jewish and the daughter of a Holocaust survivor. She lives in Atlanta with her husband, Kenneth Taylor. They have two children. Taylor is also a part-time resident of Steamboat Springs, Colorado.

References

Living people
Representatives of the United States to the United Nations Human Rights Council
Mills College alumni
Boston University alumni
Year of birth missing (living people)
People from Palo Alto, California
People from Atlanta
People from Steamboat Springs, Colorado
21st-century American Jews
American women diplomats